Moncong Lompobattang is a mountain in Indonesia with an elevation of 2,874 m. Moncong Lompobattang is ranked 116th in the world by topographic prominence.

There is a small antenna compound at the summit of Moncong Lompobattang, along with a triangular pillar and a boulder with the names previous climbers written on it. One kilometre north of the summit lies a slightly lower sub-peak known as Puncak Ko’bang (2,870 m) which is the alleged site of the tomb of a King of Gowa. The two peaks, including the entire mountain and its surrounding area, are considered spiritually significant among local people.

See also
 List of Ultras of Malay Archipelago

References

External links
 "Moncong Lompobatang, Indonesia" on Peakbagger

Moncong Lompotabang
Landforms of South Sulawesi